The 1978–79 season was FC Dinamo București's 30th season in Divizia A. Dinamo battled for the championship with FC Argeş until the last day when the two teams met in Bucharest. The winner was the new champion, in case of a draw, the title went to Piteşti. Dinamo took an early lead, but FC Argeş came back and in the 70th minute led 3–1. Dinamo managed to draw, 3–3 in the 89th minute, but even if the Piteşti squad would have been champions, Nicolae Dobrin secured the title with a goal in the injury time. Dinamo finished second, and in the Romanian Cup was eliminated in the semifinals by Sportul Studenţesc.

Results

References 
 www.labtof.ro
 www.romaniansoccer.ro

1978
Association football clubs 1978–79 season
Dinamo